The rim is a piece of basketball equipment, the circular metal ring holding up the net. It hangs from the backboard. The rim had a diameter of 18 inches. A slam dunk requires one to jump high enough to get his hand above or over the rim. Today there are breakaway rims.

References

Basketball